Dana Brinson (born April 10, 1965) is an American former professional football player who was a wide receiver in the National Football League (NFL). He was drafted by the San Diego Chargers in the eighth round of the 1989 NFL Draft. He played college football at Nebraska.

Brinson made the Chargers' roster in 1989, when he competed in the preseason with popular veteran Lionel James, who was eventually cut in favor of the quicker rookie. Brinson also played for the London Monarchs of the World League of American Football.

References

1965 births
Living people
People from Valdosta, Georgia
American football wide receivers
Nebraska Cornhuskers football players
San Diego Chargers players
London Monarchs players